This page list topics related to Cape Verde.



0-9

A
Administrative divisions of Cape Verde
African Party for the Independence of Cape Verde
Associação dos Escuteiros de Cabo Verde

B
Barlavento Islands

C
Cape Verde swamp-warbler
Cape Verdean Creole
Cape Verdean diaspora
Cape Verdean escudo
Communications in Cape Verde
Community of Portuguese Language Countries
Culture of Cape Verde

D
Demographics of Cape Verde

E
Economy of Cape Verde

F
Flag of Cape Verde
Foreign relations of Cape Verde

G
Geography of Cape Verde
Grogue

H
History of Cape Verde
 Human rights in Cape Verde

I

J

K

L
Cape Verdean Language (Creole)
LGBT rights in Cape Verde (Gay rights)
Law enforcement in Cape Verde

M
Macaronesia
Military of Cape Verde
Movement for Democracy
Music of Cape Verde

N
Newspapers in Cape Verde

O

P
PAICV
Politics of Cape Verde
Public holidays in Cape Verde

Q

R
Raul Pires Ferreira Chaves

S

T
Transportation in Cape Verde

U

V

W

X

Y

Z

See also
Lists of country-related topics - similar lists for other countries

 
Cape Verde